The Charles C. Jensen Botanical Gardens are botanical gardens located at 8520 Fair Oaks Boulevard, Carmichael, California. They are open during the daylight hours without charge.

The gardens exhibit a variety of flora including camellias, dogwoods, azaleas, and rhododendrons.

See also
 List of botanical gardens in the United States

Botanical gardens in California
Carmichael, California
Parks in Sacramento County, California